Rigorosum is a type of examination, literally "rigorous exam", commonly as a prerequisite to obtaining an academic degree, whose formal definition depends on the country. It may refer to:
Oral exam called Rigorosum in German-speaking countries

, Hungary, "rigorous exam"

Educational assessment and evaluation